Roger Ford may refer to:
 Roger Ford (journalist)
 Roger Ford (production designer)
 Roger Ford (cricketer)

See also
 Rodger Ford, American businessman